Kandiküla is a village in Tähtvere Parish, Tartu County, Estonia. It is located just west of the city of Tartu, behind the Tartu ring road (part of E263). Kandiküla has a population of 98 (as of 31 December 2010).

References

Villages in Tartu County